An unidentified model of North Korean main battle tank was unveiled during the October 2020 military parade that commemorated the 75th anniversary of the foundation of the Worker's Party. It has been given the unofficial name "M2020".

Background 

North Korea originally relied on Soviet and Chinese made tanks before they started developing their own tanks, starting with the Chonma-ho tank. Newer Pokpung-ho and Songun-915 (a 'Pokpung-ho' with cast turret and modified hull) tanks would be developed and introduced in the early 21st century but were still heavily influenced by old Soviet/Russian and Chinese tank designs; namely by the T-62. At the beginning of the 21st century, North Korea was able to obtain T-72 tanks through various channels and various parts of it, which would be used in the development of their tanks.

History 
On the October 10, 2020, DPRK held a rare night time military parade to celebrate the 75th anniversary of the Workers' Party of Korea's foundation. During the parade, nine of the new tanks were unveiled, alongside new armored fighting vehicles, rocket artilleries, and ballistic missiles, such as the Hwasong-16 and Pukguksong-4 missiles. The tanks displayed were stated to be prototypes.

Design

General layout and armor 
Visually, the "M2020" tank appears to be a mix design of the American M1 Abrams and the Russian T-14 Armata or Iranian Zulfiqar tank , although its overall layout is more similar to the latter than the former. The front of the turret's armor is angled similarly to the M1 Abrams. The hull of the tank features armor plates on the sides, with slat armor on the rear sides protecting the engine just like the T-14. The glacis plate of the "M2020" is slightly different from the T-14 and the driver's position is located at the center front of the hull. The tank is equipped with composite armor that is believed to be on par with ones equipped on third generation main battle tanks and is possibly modular in design. Parts of the turret appear to have armor up to 10 cm thick to defend against top attack munitions.
Compared to the Songun-915 tank, the commander sits in the right side of the turret. The change in position may indicate an addition of an autoloader inside the turret. The tank has seven road wheels, indicating that it is bigger than previous North Korean tanks (which have six wheels). These road wheels are protected by rubber plates or skirts.

Armament 
The tank's main gun is derived from the Russian 2A46 125 mm gun, which are also used on the Chonma-216 and Songun-915 tanks. A coaxial machine gun is located left of the main gun and an AGS-30 grenade launcher is located on the left side of the roof of the turret. The tank also has two Bulsae-3 anti-tank missiles on the right side of the turret. The Bulsae-3 missiles are said to be reversed engineered Soviet/Russian 9K111 Fagot or 9M133 Kornet missiles. However, the diameter of the ATGM launchers appears to be 150 mm like the 9M133, rather than 120 mm of the 9K111 and thus have a higher penetration. As the T-72s received by North Korea are of early modifications, they cannot fire missiles through the gun tube and thus the reverse-engineered gun used on their tanks cannot do so either, although gun launched missiles are constrained by the barrel diameter and have less penetration.

Mobility 
The "M2020" tank is believed to powered by a 1200 horsepower engine used on the Songun-915 tanks. The estimated mass of the tank is 55 tons, or above 50 tons. The tank is noted to be relatively compact in size, which is advantageous for armored fighting vehicles traversing hilly and mountainous terrains, such as the geography of the Korean Peninsula.

Sensors and countermeasures 
The roof of the turret features panoramic sights and a meteorological mast on the right side, and smoke grenade launchers at the rear of the turret protected by slat armor. The commander and gunner have separate sights, which are believed to have thermal imaging devices. If true, then it would improve the tank's hunter-killer and night fighting capabilities compared to older North Korean tanks. The tank possesses a muzzle reference system to improve its accuracy when firing on the move. Hard kill active protection systems (APS) are possibly fitted on the lower part of the turret; two in the front corners and two on each side, each containing three tube launchers. This APS layout is similar to the Russian Afghanit featured on the T-14. The sensors used for the possible active protection systems are located in the front corners of the turret. This design is similarly seen on the M1A2C (SEPv3).

Reactions 
While the biggest highlight of the 75th anniversary Worker's Party parade was the unveiling of the Hwasong-16 ballistic missile, the appearance of the "M2020" tank has also taken observers and defense experts by surprise. The "M2020" tank is strikingly distinct in that it does away with the older T-62 design in many preceding North Korean tanks in favor of a more modern design. As such, the tank has been compared to the American M1A2 Abrams, the Russian T-14 Armata, and to some extent, the Chinese VT-4. There is speculation that the "M2020" may have been assisted by Russian or Chinese technological transfers due to its very modern design. The nine tanks displayed at the military parade are believed to be prototypes or proof of concept intended for future development or production in the future. Curiously, the "M2020" tank sported a desert tan camouflage scheme during the military parade, which is unusual considering there are no deserts in the Korean Peninsula. The choice of color is speculated to be intended for the tank to be compared to Western, Russian, and/or Chinese tanks or to be appealing as an exportable weapon. The "M2020" tank is stated to be a testament to the North Korean defense industries' ingenuity despite being under an arms embargo and international sanctions. The "M2020" tanks (along with other paraded weapons) are also seen as North Korea's efforts to modernize its military.

In an interview with Professor Sung Woo, the head of the Department of Military Drones at Shinhan University and a former policy advisor to the Joint Chiefs of Staff (South Korea), he stated the "M2020" is a technological leap over existing North Korean tanks. He also stated that the tank's development may have been assisted by Iran by using technologies and designs from the Zulfiqar-3 tank. North Korea and Iran are known to cooperate with regards to their militaries. Professor Sung Woo has implied that the "M2020" may be classified as somewhere between a third and fourth generation main battle tank based on comparisons to older North Koreans and modern foreign tanks. He concluded that the "M2020" can become a serious threat to the K1 and the K2 tanks and that the South Korean military should improve networking capabilities and develop active protection systems to counter the "M2020" tanks. 

There are doubts over the design and capabilities of the "M2020" tank. While it is believed to be a leap over predecessor tanks, the "M2020" is likely no where near as advanced as the M1 Abrams or the T-14 Armata. The active protection systems displayed are believed to be a mock-up or a proof of concept, as sensors required for the countermeasure to work are likely unobtainable to North Korea. The sensors and sights on the tank are also believed to be a dummy. Likewise, the sensors, communication, networking, and composite armor technologies seen in advanced third and fourth generation main battle tanks are believed to not be present in the "M2020" tanks. The "M2020" tank is also believed to still be based on old Soviet tank designs due to North Korea's extensive usage and experience with the T-62 design.

Notes 

 1.This tank adopted several characteristics from the Pokpung-ho tank variant called Chonma-216 that was unveiled in 2017. Chonma-216 featured a 125 mm main gun based on the Russian 2A46, dual AGS-30 grenade launchers on the roof of the turret, and two Bulsae-3 anti-tank missiles on the side.

References 

Main battle tanks of North Korea
Post–Cold War main battle tanks
Fourth-generation main battle tanks